is a Japanese football player currently playing for Ventforet Kofu.

Club statistics
Updated to 24 February 2019.

1Includes J2 Playoffs.

References

External links
Profile at Matsumoto Yamaga 
Profile at Urawa Reds 

Hiroyuki Takasaki at Yahoo! Japan sports 

1986 births
Living people
Komazawa University alumni
Association football people from Ibaraki Prefecture
Japanese footballers
J1 League players
J2 League players
J3 League players
Urawa Red Diamonds players
Mito HollyHock players
Ventforet Kofu players
Tokushima Vortis players
Kashima Antlers players
Montedio Yamagata players
Matsumoto Yamaga FC players
FC Gifu players
Association football forwards